Antoaneta Stefanova (born 19 April 1979) is a Bulgarian chess grandmaster and Women's World Champion from 2004 to 2006. She has represented Bulgaria in the Chess Olympiad in 2000 and the Women's Chess Olympiad since 1992.

Early life and career 
Stefanova was born in Sofia, the capital of Bulgaria. When she was four years old, she received chess lessons from her father, Andon Stefanov, a designing artist.

In 1989, Stefanova won the Girls U10 section at the World Youth Chess Festival in Aguadilla, Puerto Rico. In 1992, she played, at the age of 13, in her first Chess Olympiad in Manila, Philippines. In the same year she became European under-14 girls' champion at the European Youth Chess Championship in Rimavská Sobota. Stefanova won the Bulgarian women's championship in 1995.

She tied for fourth place in the 4th Hawaii International Chess Tournament in 1997 scoring 7 points out of 10 games. Thanks to this result Stefanova achieved her first norm for the title Grandmaster. 
In January 1998, her FIDE rating broke into the top ten of women worldwide.
She played in the open section at the 2000 Chess Olympiad. 
In 2001, Stefanova tied for first place (finishing second on countback) in the 19th Andorra Open.

In June 2002, she won the 3rd European Individual Women's Championship in Varna.
Stefanova was awarded the title of Grandmaster at the FIDE Presidential Board meeting in Doha in July 2002 as the ninth woman to ever have reached that rank.
At the end of July 2002, she won the Wismilak International Chess Tournament, a category 8 (average rating 2446) round-robin tournament in Surabaya, Indonesia, scoring 9½/11 points with a performance rating of 2750.

She participated in the 2004 Corus B tournament in Wijk aan Zee, the Netherlands: she scored 6/13 points with a rating performance of 2537, placing ninth out of fourteen participants. Stefanova became the tenth Women's World Chess Champion in June 2004 by winning a 64-player knockout tournament held in Elista, Kalmykia, under the auspices of FIDE.

In 2008, she won the North Urals Cup in Krasnoturinsk, Russia, and the women's individual rapid tournament of the 2008 World Mind Sports Games in Beijing. In 2012, Stefanova won the Women's World Rapid Chess Championship.
She was the runner-up in the Women's World Chess Championship 2012, losing to Anna Ushenina in the final on the tie-break. In 2017, Stefanova won two gold medals at the IMSA Elite Mind Games in Huai'an, China, in the women's rapid chess event and the women's blitz chess event.

Political career 
In 2021 she became a Member of Parliament for There Is Such A People and was nominated as the party's candidate for the prime minister position.

References

External links

 
 
 
 
 Antoaneta Stefanova chess games and profile at Chess-DB.com
 Interview with GM Antoaneta Stefanova 

1979 births
Living people
Chess grandmasters
Female chess grandmasters
Chess woman grandmasters
Women's world chess champions
European Chess Champions
World Youth Chess Champions
Bulgarian female chess players
Chess players from Sofia